Richard G. Ang, O.P. (born January 30, 1968) is a Filipino priest, divinity scholar, and educational administrator. He is the 97th Rector Magnificus of the University of Santo Tomas (UST), the oldest and the largest Catholic university in Manila, Philippines. He is the eighth Filipino to become rector of the pontifical university.

Education
Ang is an alumnus of the Faculty of Arts and Letters, graduating with a Bachelor of Arts in Philosophy in 1990. He finished his degree in Sacred Theology in 1997, and his Master of Arts in Theology in 1999 from the University of Santo Tomas Faculties of Ecclesiastical Studies. He graduated from the University of Santo Tomas Graduate School with a Doctor of Philosophy degree in 2010.

Career
He was ordained into priesthood in 1998 with the Dominican order. He was a full-time professor and was promoted to become Dean of one of the university's oldest schools - the Faculty of Philosophy. 

Ang was Vice Rector of the University of Santo Tomas from 2012 and had become acting rector of the university upon the end of the term of Herminio Dagohoy.

After topping the elections of the Academic Senate from a terna, Ang's name was formally nominated by Master General Very Reverend Gerard Timoner to the Holy See. Ang's official appointment as Rector Magnificus came after securing papal approval from the Vatican through the Congregation for Catholic Education lead by Cardinal Prefect Giuseppe Versaldi and Monsignor Angelo Vincenzo Zani.

References

Members of the Dominican Order
20th-century Filipino Roman Catholic priests
Academic staff of the University of Santo Tomas
University of Santo Tomas alumni
Rector Magnificus of the University of Santo Tomas
Living people
1971 births
21st-century Filipino Roman Catholic priests